Yu Min may refer to:

Yu Min (physicist) (1926–2019), Chinese nuclear physicist
Yu Min (linguist) (1916–1995), Chinese linguist
Yuko Fueki (born 1979), Japanese actress known in South Korea as Yu Min

See also
Yumin (disambiguation)